Marie-Nicolas-Antoine Daveluy (16 March 1818 – 30 March 1866) was a French missionary and saint. His feast day is March 30, and he is also venerated along with the rest of the 103 Korean martyrs on September 20.

Biography

Antoine Daveluy was born 16 March 1818 in Amiens, France. His father was a factory owner, town councilman, and government official. The members of his family were devout Catholics and two of his brothers became priests. He entered the St. Sulpice Seminary in Issy-les-Moulineaux himself in October 1834 and was ordained a priest on 18 December 1841.

His first assignment was as an assistant priest in Roye. Despite poor health, he joined the Paris Foreign Missions Society on 4 October 1843. He departed for East Asia on 6 February 1844, intending to serve as a missionary in the Ryukyu Islands of Japan. He arrived in Macau, where he was persuaded by the newly appointed apostolic vicar of Korea, Jean-Joseph-Jean-Baptiste Ferréol, to accompany him there instead. The two were joined by Andrew Kim Tae-gŏn, a Korean seminarian who had been studying for the priesthood in Macau. They first traveled to Shanghai, where Bishop Ferréol ordained Father Kim on 17 August 1845. The three priests then made a stormy crossing by sea to Korea, arriving in Chungcheong Province in October.

Father Daveluy began work as a missionary in Korea, becoming fluent in the language. He wrote a Korean-French dictionary and other books about the Catholic Church and its history in Korean. On 13 November 1855, Pope Pius IX appointed him titular bishop of Akka and coadjutor to Bishop Siméon-François Berneux, who had been appointed apostolic vicar in 1854 after the death of Bishop Ferréol in 1853. He was consecrated by Bishop Berneux on 25 March 1857.

After Bishop Berneux was executed during a campaign by the Korean government against Christians, Bishop Daveluy became apostolic vicar on 8 March 1866. He was promptly arrested on 11 March. Imprisoned and tortured, he staunchly defended his Catholic faith. Sentenced to death, he asked to be executed on Good Friday 30 March. He was beheaded at a Korean naval base in Galmaemot (갈매못) near present-day Boryeong along with two French priests, Pierre Aumaître and Martin-Luc Huin, and two lay catechists, Lucas Hwang Sŏk-tu (Bishop Daveluy's personal assistant) and Joseph Chang Chu-gi.

All five were canonized on 6 May 1984 along with Father Kim, Bishop Berneux and 96 other Korean martyrs.

See also

Roman Catholicism in South Korea
French campaign against Korea (1866)
Claude-Charles Dallet

References

Bibliography
The Lives of the 103 Korean Martyr Saints: Bishop Marie Nicholas Antoine Daveluy (1818-1866), Catholic Bishops' Conference of Korea Newsletter No. 47 (Summer 2004).
 Remigius Ritzler and Pirminus Sefrin (1968). Hierarchia catholica medii et recentioris aevi, vol. 7. Il Messaggero di S. Antonio, Padua. .
 Remigius Ritzler and Pirminus Sefrin (1978). Hierarchia catholica medii et recentioris aevi, vol. 8. Il Messaggero di S. Antonio, Padua. .
Bishop Anthony Daveluy, Pontifical Society of the Holy Childhood Bulletin 15 (24 March 2009), p. 11.
 Paul Le Gall (1966). Mgr Antoine Daveluy: témoin du Christ en Corée, 1818-1866. Les Auxiliaires du clergé, Saint-Riquier.
 Charles Salmon (1883). Vie de Mgr Daveluy: évêque d'Acônes, vicaire apostolique de Corée. Bray et Retaux, Paris.

External links

 Archives of the Paris Foreign Missions Society
Catholic Hierarchy
Galmaemot Martyrs Sacred Place
Martyrium Galmaemot

1818 births
1866 deaths
Martyred Roman Catholic priests
19th-century French Roman Catholic priests
French Roman Catholic saints
Korean Roman Catholic saints
Paris Foreign Missions Society missionaries
Roman Catholic archbishops of Seoul
19th-century Roman Catholic martyrs
19th-century Christian saints
19th-century executions by Korea
People executed by Korea by decapitation
French people executed abroad
Christian martyrs executed by decapitation
People from Amiens
Executed people from Picardy
French expatriates in Korea
Roman Catholic missionaries in Korea
Roman Catholic bishops of Seoul